Bulia deducta is a moth of the family Erebidae first described by Herbert Knowles Morrison in 1875. It is found from central Mexico north to central California, Utah, Wyoming and Nebraska, east to Arkansas and Alabama.

Its wingspan is 34–38 mm. Adults are on wing from March to October in the southwest.

The larvae feed on Prosopis.

References

External links

Moths of North America
Moths described in 1875
deducta